This Is! Ralph Carney is an avant-garde and experimental studio album by American multi-instrumentalist, singer and composer Ralph Carney, released on March 25, 2003 by Black Beauty Records.

Critical reception

Music journalist Robert Christgau gave the album two stars, and called Carney "a Buckeye Hornman--not quite as funny as a Hoosier Hotshot, but sweeter ("Turkey Neck," "Jug Gland Music")."

Track listing
Side one
"Jug Gland Band" – 2:32
"Get Yur Bargain" – 4:52
"Swamp Horse" – 2:22
"Pele Mele" – 4:25
"Ultra Bowl" – 1:49
"Man Don't Come" – 2:21
"Tis Sad" – 5:07
"Marshall Allen Plan" – 1:26

Side two
"Heckraiser" – 8:06
"Cow Lap" – 2:44
"March of the Annunaki" – 2:19
"Turkey Neck" – 3:14
"Hell Week" – 2:53
"15 April 2002" – 12:43
"Solitude" – 3:00

References

Ralph Carney albums
2003 albums